The men's singles of the 2022 I.ČLTK Prague Open tournament took place on clay in Prague, Czech Republic.

Tallon Griekspoor was the defending champion but chose not to compete.

Pedro Cachín won the title after defeating Lorenzo Giustino 6–3, 7–6(7–4) in the final.

Seeds

Draw

Finals

Top half

Bottom half

References

External links
Main draw
Qualifying draw

I.ČLTK Prague Open - 1
I.ČLTK Prague Open